Anam is a 1990 album by Irish folk group Clannad.  Anam is an Irish language noun meaning soul.

Track listing
 "Rí na Cruinne" (Ciarán Brennan, Máire Brennan, Noel Duggan, Padraig Duggan) – 4:03
 "Anam" (C. Brennan, Leo Brennan) – 4:03
 "In Fortune's Hand" (C. Brennan) – 3:55
 "The Poison Glen" (C. Brennan, M. Brennan, N. Duggan, P. Duggan) – 3:55
 "Wilderness" (instrumental) (C. Brennan) – 2:07
 "Why Worry?" (C. Brennan) – 4:29
 "Úirchill an Chreagáin" (Traditional) – 4:24
 "Love and Affection" (C. Brennan) – 4:59
 "You're the One" (C. Brennan, M. Brennan) – 3:55
 "Dobhar" (instrumental) (C. Brennan) – 2:40

The 1992 USA release featured two bonus tracks: "In a Lifetime" (a duet with Bono) was included as the second track after "Rí na Cruinne", and "Theme from Harry's Game" was inserted between "Wilderness" and "Why Worry?" as the seventh track.

A 2005 reissue featured one bonus track: "Rí na Cruinne" (Lazyboy Mix), with a runtime of 4:45.

Singles
 "In Fortune's Hand"
 "Why Worry?"

References

External links
 This album at Northern Skyline

1990 albums
Clannad albums
RCA Records albums